Queen Mary's Dark Harbor is a yearly Halloween haunt at the  in Long Beach, California. During the season, running from late September to the end of October, the Queen Mary itself, along with its parking lot, are converted to be part of the experience. This comprises mazes, "slider" street performances, a virtual reality horror experience, circus performance, and other entertainment forms.

Dark Harbor was developed by a team directed by David Wally, well-known for developing other projects such as the Westworld immersive activation at SXSW. The Queen Mary has a long history of ghost stories and supposed hauntings, which inspired Dark Harbor. For example, room B340, claimed to be haunted, inspired a Dark Harbor maze. 

The haunt is populated by a variety of scare performers, led by specific "Dark Harbor icons". These include the Captain, Half Hatch Henry, and the Ringmaster. Over the years, Dark Harbor went more in the direction of a "choose your own adventure" haunt, allowing for the development of alternate paths, secret bars, and hidden passages. The goal of this was immersion. Guests can stay overnight on the ship, even during the haunt.

See also
 Haunted attraction (simulated)

References

Haunted attractions (simulated)